Pontefract is a town in the metropolitan borough of the City of Wakefield, West Yorkshire, England.  In the town and surrounding area are 66 listed buildings that are recorded in the National Heritage List for England.  Of these, one is listed at Grade I, the highest of the three grades, eight are at Grade II*, the middle grade, and the others are at Grade II, the lowest grade.  Most of the listed buildings are houses and cottages, shops and offices.  The other listed buildings include churches, public buildings, public houses and hotels, the remains of a former underground hermitage, the socket stone of a former wayside cross, market buildings, a former windmill, the former gateway to a military depot, a former workhouse, and two mileposts.


Key

Buildings

References

Citations

Sources

 

Lists of listed buildings in West Yorkshire